The Rochester crime family or Rochester Mafia  was a criminal organization based in Rochester, New York that was part of the American Cosa Nostra.

History
The Rochester family's first well known official boss was Constenze "Stanley" Valenti. In 1957, after the Apalachin Conference, Stan and his brother Frank were both jailed for civil contempt, because they refused to answer questions about the meeting. In 1958, Stan was sentenced to 16 months in prison, and Jake Russo became the next boss.

Splitting from Buffalo
In 1964, Frank Valenti returned to Rochester with his brother Stan, and Pittsburgh associate Angelo Vaccaro. Frank became an associate in the Pittsburgh crime family in John LaRocca's family. Stan Valenti was married to Antonio Ripepi's daughter, who was a capo in the Pittsburgh family. This time, Frank Valenti was taking over the Rochester family. By the end of the year, Russo went missing and his body has never been found. In 1970, Valenti wiped out the last Russo soldier Billy Lupo. Also Frank Valenti told Buffalo crime family boss Stefano "The Undertaker" Magaddino that Rochester would become an independent family. Prior to this, Rochester was just a crew which answered to the Maggadino's Buffalo crime family.

The Valenti regime
Valenti created a well-organized crime family by promoting Samuel Russotti to underboss, Rene Picarreto to consigliere and Salvatore Gingello, Dominic Celestino, Thomas Didio, Angelo Vaccaro and Dominic Chirico as his capos. His most trusted ally was capo Chirico, who he gave special tasks to carry out. He divided up the family's illegal activities of gambling, extortion, loan sharking, insurance fraud, arson, narcotics and weapon trafficking among his capos to ensure peace.

Valenti created a master plan in 1970 called "The Columbus Day Bombings". He set up a special crew to bomb various churches and public buildings to draw the heat away from the family. In 1972, Valenti was approached by his underboss Samuel "Red" Russotti, his consigliere Rene Piccarreto, and highly powerful capo Salvatore "Sammy G" Gingello. The three accused Valenti of skimming profits and asked him to step down as boss; he refused. Valenti felt that the Pittsburgh family would back him and the Chirico crew up with muscle. Unknown to him was that his consigliere, Picarreto, had made a secret alliance with members of the Bonanno crime family. Valenti's most trusted capo and bodyguard, Domenic Chirico, was shot and killed on Augustine Street. Instead of fighting he was allowed to move to Phoenix, Arizona and retire. After retiring Valenti was arrested and convicted of extortion, he later died on September 20, 2008.

The Russotti era
After Valenti fled the city, Samuel Russotti became boss, Piccarreto remained as consigliere, and Gingello became the underboss. The family was strong until January 1977 when the police fabricated evidence to indict all the upper echelon. The convictions put Russotti, Piccaretto, Gingello, Thomas Marotta and Eugene DeFrancesco away for murdering Vincent Massaro with a 25 years to life sentenced. When this happened, Thomas Didio became the acting boss. Russotti thought he would be able to manipulate Didio, but he really just created a monster. Didio began demoting all the Russotti loyalist while receiving advice from imprisoned former boss Valenti. When the truth came out about the fabricated evidence, all the top guys got out of prison. This created an "A team and B Team" war. Part of the "A team" was Russotti, Piccarreto, Gingello, Richard Marino, Thomas Marotta and others. Part of the "B Team" was Thomas Didio, Rosario Chirico (Domenic's brother), Stan Valenti, Angelo Vaccaro and others.

On April 23, 1978, Salvatore "Sammy G" Gingello was killed when a bomb was detonated when he entered his car, which was parked across from the Stillson St. restaurant, Ben's Cafe Society.  On July 6, 1978 Thomas Didio was murdered by a gunman who was using a machine gun. After these two murders the FBI decided it was time to crack down on the situation, with RICO coming into play they took down most of the remaining key players. In 1988, Angelo Amico and Loren Piccarreto were both indicted under the Racketeer Influenced and Corrupt Organizations Act (RICO). Angelo Amico was the acting boss, and Loren Piccarreto (son of Rene Piccarreto) was the underboss.

Historical leadership

Boss (official and acting)
c. 1950s–1958 – Constenze "Stanley" Valenti – imprisoned
1958–1964 – Jake Russo – murdered
1964–1972 – Frank Valenti – retired, died on September 20, 2008 
1972–1993 – Samuel "Red" Russotti – imprisoned in 1984; died in 1993
Acting 1977–1978 – Thomas Didio – murdered July 1978 during the "A & B Wars"
Acting 1977–1978 – Salvatore "Sammy G" Gingello – murdered April 23, 1978 during the "A & B Wars"
Acting 1988 – Angelo Amico – arrested in 1988; released in 1993
Acting 1988 – Loren Piccarreto – son of Rene Piccarreto; arrested 1988; released in 1994

Underboss 
1964–1972 – Samuel "Red" Russotti – promoted to boss
1972–1978 – Salvatore "Sammy G" Gingello – promoted to acting boss
1978–1984 – Richard Marino – convicted imprisoned for murder
1984–1988 – Loren Piccarreto – promoted acting boss

Consigliere 
1964–1984 – Rene Piccarreto – imprisoned in 1984; released in 2007; died March 2014.

Government informants
Joseph "Spike" LaNovara - former soldier. He was a part of Frank Valenti's regime and became an informer in the early 1970s after facing murder charges.
Angelo Monachino - former soldier. It is believed he participated in the December 14, 1970 murder of William Constable. He owned a construction company named Barmon Construction. Monachino also served as an accomplice in the murder of Jimmy "the Hammer" Massaro, as he allowed the murder to take place inside of a garage located at his business property; Massaro was shot 9 times. He agreed to become an informer in 1975. In September 1975, he was arrested along with former Rochester mob boss Frank Valenti, and Jimmy Massaro who was murdered in November 1973, and were accused of burning down a warehouse and receiving $80,000 insurance money in September 1971.
Anthony Oliveri - former soldier. It is noted that he was a close friend of fellow Rochester crime family member, Anthony Columbo. It is believed he and Columbo conspired to murder Angelo DeMarco in March 1978, as the pair had parked their car in front of DeMarco's home and were in a car chase with law enforcement on the same night, a .357 Magnum and a .12 gauge shotgun were found in the car. Oliveri participated in the July 1978 murder of Thomas Didio, who was murdered by Anthony Columbo with a machine gun, inside of a motel in Victor, New York. He was allegedly inducted into the Rochester mob in December 1978. He became an informer since at least in 1980. He testified in December 1984 against several members of the Rochester crime family.

References
Notes

External links
American Gangland: Valenti Crime Family
Valenti, Frank (2007–2011) lacndb.com
A complete, in-depth history of the Rochester Crime Family
 YouTube "The Rochester, NY Crime Family - Documentary (A/B Team Wars + Downfall)"

Organizations established in the 1950s
1950s establishments in New York (state)
Organizations disestablished in 1993
1993 disestablishments in New York (state)
Organizations based in Rochester, New York
Italian-American crime families
Gangs in New York (state)
Italian-American culture in New York (state)